In calculus, a branch of mathematics, the notions of one-sided differentiability and semi-differentiability of a real-valued function f of a real variable are weaker than differentiability. Specifically, the function f is said to be right differentiable at a point a if, roughly speaking, a derivative can be defined as the function's argument x moves to a from the right, and left differentiable at a if the derivative can be defined as x moves to a from the left.

One-dimensional case

In mathematics, a left derivative and a right derivative are derivatives (rates of change of a function) defined for movement in one direction only (left or right; that is, to lower or higher values) by the argument of a function.

Definitions

Let f denote a real-valued function defined on a subset I of the real numbers.

If  is a limit point of   and the one-sided limit

exists as a real number, then f is called right differentiable at a and the limit ∂+f(a) is called the right derivative of f at a.

If  is a limit point of   and the one-sided limit

exists as a real number, then f is called left differentiable at a and the limit ∂–f(a) is called the left derivative of f at a.

If the left and right derivatives are equal, then they have the same value as the usual ("bidirectional") derivative. One can also define a symmetric derivative, which equals the arithmetic mean of the left and right derivatives (when they both exist), so the symmetric derivative may exist when the usual derivative does not.

Remarks and examples

 A function is differentiable at an interior point a of its domain if and only if it is semi-differentiable at a and the left derivative is equal to the right derivative. 
 An example of a semi-differentiable function, which is not differentiable, is the absolute value function , at a = 0. We find easily 
 If a function is semi-differentiable at a point a, it implies that it is continuous at a.
 The indicator function 1[0,∞) is right differentiable at every real a, but discontinuous at zero (note that this indicator function is not left differentiable at zero).

Application

If a real-valued, differentiable function f, defined on an interval I of the real line, has zero derivative everywhere, then it is constant, as an application of the mean value theorem shows. The assumption of differentiability can be weakened to continuity and one-sided differentiability of f. The version for right differentiable functions is given below, the version for left differentiable functions is analogous.

Differential operators acting to the left or the right
Another common use is to describe derivatives treated as binary operators in infix notation, in which the derivatives is to be applied either to the left or right operands.  This is useful, for example, when defining generalizations of the Poisson bracket.  For a pair of functions f and g, the left and right derivatives are respectively defined as

In bra–ket notation, the derivative operator can act on the right operand as the regular derivative or on the left as the negative derivative.

Higher-dimensional case

This above definition can be generalized to real-valued functions f defined on subsets of Rn using a weaker version of the directional derivative. Let a be an interior point of the domain of f. Then f is called semi-differentiable at the point a if for every direction u ∈ Rn the limit

with  R exists as a real number.

Semi-differentiability is thus weaker than Gateaux differentiability, for which one takes in the limit above h → 0 without restricting h to only positive values.

Indeed, 
 with 

(Note that this generalization is not equivalent to the original definition for n = 1 since the concept of one-sided limit points is replaced with the stronger concept of interior points.)

Properties

 Any convex function on a convex open subset of Rn is semi-differentiable. 
 While every semi-differentiable function of one variable is continuous; this is no longer true for several variables.

Generalization

Instead of real-valued functions, one can consider functions taking values in Rn or in a Banach space.

See also
 Derivative
 Directional derivative
 Partial derivative
 Gradient
 Gateaux derivative
 Fréchet derivative
 Derivative (generalizations)
 Phase space formulation#Star product
 Dini derivatives

References

 

Real analysis
Differential calculus
Articles containing proofs
Functions and mappings